Nelo Cosimi (1894 – 5 October 1945) was an Italian-born Argentine actor and film director. He directed thirteen films including the 1936 historical gaucho film Juan Moreira. He was married to the Italian-Argentine actress Chita Foras.

Selected filmography

Actor
 Legend of the Inca Bridge (1923)
 Malambo (1942)
 Lauracha (1946)

Director
 Juan Moreira (1936)
 The Blue Squadron (1937)

References

External links
 

1894 births
1945 deaths
People from Macerata
Argentine film directors
Argentine male film actors
Male screenwriters
Italian emigrants to Argentina
20th-century Italian male actors
20th-century Argentine screenwriters
20th-century Argentine male writers